Virginie Atger (born 26 September 1984) is a French equestrian endurance rider. She won the silver medal at the Individual endurance at the 2006 World Equestrian Games in Aachen, Germany in 2006.

External links
 https://web.archive.org/web/20150402110216/http://www.ceerbourgogne.com/uploaded-files/files/documentclassement.pdf (in French)

French female equestrians
Living people
1984 births
Place of birth missing (living people)
21st-century French women